David Mitchell Pletcher ( – ) was an American historian, considered an expert in his field. He was a history professor at Indiana University from 1965 to 1990.

Biography 
Pletcher was born June 14, 1920, in Faribault, Minnesota He attended the University of Chicago, earning three degrees in history: a B.A. and an M.A. in 1941, and a Ph.D. in 1946.

Pletcher's initial academic post was as a history instructor at the University of Iowa, from 1944 to 1946. He served as an associate professor, first at Knox College from 1946 to 1956, then at Hamline University from 1956 to 1965. In 1965 he joined Indiana University as a full professor; he remained there until his retirement in 1990.

Pletcher served as an advisor for the 1999 PBS documentary U.S.-Mexican War (1846–1848).

He was a member of the Organization of American Historians and the American Historical Association, as well as the Society for Historians of American Foreign Relations, where he served as vice president in 1979 and president in 1980.

Pletcher died February 22, 2004, in Bloomington, Indiana.

Awards
In 1957, the American Historical Association awarded Pletcher the Albert J. Beveridge Award, given for the best book in English on the history of the United States, Latin America, or Canada from 1492 to the present, for his book Rails, Mines, and Progress: Seven American Promoters in Mexico. In 1961, he received a McKnight Foundation Award.

Notable works

References

External links
 

20th-century American historians
20th-century American male writers
Indiana University faculty
1920 births
2004 deaths
University of Chicago alumni
University of Iowa faculty
Knox College (Illinois) faculty
Hamline University faculty
Writers from Minnesota
Historians of the United States
Historians of Latin America
Historians from Indiana
Historians from Minnesota
American male non-fiction writers